Josef Abramovich Ringo was a Russian scientist, inventor, writer.

Life and career
Josef Ringo was born in Vitebsk in 1883. From 1905 until 1918 he studied and worked in both Switzerland and France. Ringo graduated from the Universities of Bern, Zurich and Nancy, received an education as an engineer and philosopher. He was fluent in five languages.

In 1917 in Switzerland he published the book Jewish Question in its Historical Context and its Proposed Solution. In the book, he analyzed the history of the so-called Jewish question, and advocated the establishment of a Jewish state.

In Switzerland Josef met Vladimir Lenin. Lenin invited Ringo to come to Moscow to take part in the plan of electrification of Moscow. From 1918 to 1922 he worked as the head of the electric department of  Moscow and the Moscow region, provincial electrical engineer, then director of the electrical installation office of the Moscow Sovnarkhoz and the department of small-scale electrification of the Supreme Soviet of the National Economy. Later he was employed as a worker in the chemical industry. In 1921 under Lenin's order Ringo managed to electrify the residence of Lenin in Gorki in an extremely short amount of time.
Ringo patented  a large number of inventions, including patents in the field of lightning protection.

References

Links 
Lenin's archive. November 1920 (third decade). 
Lenin's archive. April 1921 (second decade). 
Lenin's archive. Январь 1921 (second decade til 22). 

1883 births
1946 deaths
Belarusian Jews
Belarusian Zionists
Scientists from Vitebsk
People from Vitebsky Uyezd
Russian Jews
Russian Zionists
Soviet inventors
Soviet scientists
Soviet writers